The 2012–13 Pro Tour season was the eighteenth season of the Magic: The Gathering Pro Tour. It started on 19 May 2012 with Grand Prix Malmö, and ended on 19 May 2013 with the conclusion of Pro Tour Dragon's Maze in San Diego. The season consisted of 44 Grand Prix and three Pro Tours, which were held in Seattle, Montreal and San Diego. At the end of the season Josh Utter-Leyton was proclaimed Pro Player of the Year.

Grand Prix: Malmö, Minneapolis, Anaheim, Manila, Yokohama, Vancouver, Atlanta, São Paulo, Ghent, Columbus, Shanghai 

GP Malmö (19–20 May 2012)
Format: Limited
Attendance: 922
 Matteo Versari
 Oscar Almgren
 Søren Larsen
 Pere Llimos Muntal
 Jasper Grimmer
 Jon Westberg
 Samuele Estratti
 David Hylander

GP Manila (16–17 June 2012)
Format: Standard
Attendance: 1108
 Yuuya Watanabe
 Rick Lee
 Hironobu Sugaya
 Richmond Tan
 Jonathan Luces
 Martin Juza
 Weng Heng Soh
 Jacklord Nerez

GP Atlanta (30 June–1 July 2012)
Format: Legacy
Attendance: 905
 Gaudenis Vidugiris
 Michael Majors
 Daryl Ayers
 Fred Edelkamp
 Ben Stark
 Sawyer Lucy
 Gerardo Fedon
 Samuel Black

GP Columbus (21–22 July 2012)
Format: Modern
Attendance: 1046
 Jacob Maynard
 Lucas Siow
 Max Tietze
 Aaron Estrin
 Shahar Shenhar
 Chris Piland
 Orrin Beasley
 Caleb Estrada

GP Minneapolis (19–20 May 2012)
Format: Standard
Attendance: 1052
 Christian Calcano
 Brad Nelson
 Rick Stout
 Stephen Bishop
 Taylor Laehn
 Josh Utter-Leyton
 Ben Friedman
 Jerret Schultz

GP Yokohoma (23–24 June 2012)
Format: Modern
Attendance: 1523
 Jyun'ichi Miyajima
 Kei Umehara
 Satoshi Yamaguchi
 Toshiyuki Kadooka
 Hiroya Miyamoto
 Yuki Yotsumoto
 Youichi Nagami
 Masaki Ushijima

GP São Paulo (21–22 July 2012)
Format: Limited
Attendance: 738
 Reinaldo Gomes da Silva Jr.
 Rodrigo Gonçalves dos Santos
 Thiago Oliveira
 José Francisco Dantas Mangueira da Silva
 Luiz Henrique Martine de Lima
 Guido Quintana
 Rafael Mendonca
 Daniel Fior

GP Shanghai (28–29 July 2012)
Format: Limited
Attendance: 836
 Bo Li
 Fengwen Gu
 Nan Wu
 Rei Satou
 Yang Wang
 Nicholas Jonathan Wong
 Xiang Xue Song
 Toshiya Kanegawa

GP Anaheim (26–27 May 2012)
Format: Block Constructed
Attendance: 938
 Marc Lalague
 Paul Rietzl
 Noah Koessel
 Eric Froehlich
 Michael Hopkins
 Brian Kibler
 John Sittner
 Jason Rosellini

GP Vancouver (23–24 June 2012)
Format: Limited
Attendance: 849
 David Stroud
 Jeremey Schofield
 Steven Riecken
 Marcin Sciesinski
 Colin Miller
 Brian Wong
 Sean Peterson
 Morgan Chang

GP Ghent (21–22 July 2012)
Format: Legacy
Attendance: 1345
 Timo Schünemann
 Lukas Maurer
 Emanuele Marcotti
 Elias Watsfeldt
 Max Sjoblom
 Elias Klocker
 Andreas Milillo
 Tristan Polzl

World Magic Cup 
Indianapolis (16–19 August 2012)
 Prize pool: $136,000
 Format: Standard, Booster Draft, Team Constructed, Team Limited
 Attendance: 283 players representing 71 countries/regions

Top 8

Final standings

Grand Prix: Boston 
GP Boston (25–26 August 2012)
Format: Limited
Attendance: 1845
 Brian Demars
 Robert Victory
 Cedric Phillips
 Alex Lloyd
 Kevin Michael
 Jason Ford
 Thomas Holzinger
 Shouta Yasooka

2012 Magic Players Championship 
Seattle (29–31 August 2012)
Prize pool: $108,000
Format: Modern, Cube Draft, Booster Draft
Attendance: 16

Top 4 playoff

Final standings 
The following sixteen players received an invitation to the 2012 Players Championship due to their performance in the 2012 season. They are ordered according to the final standings of the event.

Grand Prix: San Jose (Costa Rica), Moscow, San Jose (USA)

GP San Jose, Costa Rica (15–16 September 2012)
Format: Limited
Attendance: 364
 Shuhei Nakamura
 David Sharfman
 Ben Stark
 Willy Edel
 Josh Utter-Leyton
 David Ochoa
 A.J. Sacher
 Pascal Maynard

GP Moscow (15–16 September 2012)
Format: Limited
Attendance: 869
 Luca Casadei
 Wenzel Krautmann
 Petr Kuznetsov
 Roman Masaladzhiu
 Anatoly Chuhwichev
 Hannes Kerem
 Konstantin Yarosh
 Dmitriy Tolkatchov

GP San Jose, USA (13–14 October 2012)
Format: Team limited
Attendance: 1713 (571 teams)
1.
 Matthew Sperling
 David Williams
 Paul Rietzl
2.
 Maksym Gryn
 Lucas Siow
 Jamie Naylor
3.
 Conley Woods
 Eric Froehlich
 Owen Turtenwald
4.
 Ivan Floch
 Lukas Jaklovsky
 Stanislav Cifka

Pro Tour Return to Ravnica 
Seattle (19–21 October 2012)
Prize pool: $233,500
Format: Modern, Booster Draft
Attendance: 383

Pro Tour Return to Ravnica was the first major Modern event with Return to Ravnica in the format.

Top 8

Final standings

Grand Prix: Philadelphia, Lyon, Auckland, Chicago, Bochum, Charleston, Taipei, San Antonio, Lisbon, Toronto, Nagoya, Indianapolis, Denver, Atlantic City, Singapore, Bilbao, Sydney, London 

GP Philadelphia (27–28 October 2012)
Format: Limited
Attendance: 1986
 Shuhei Nakamura
 Lukas Jaklovsky
 Martin Juza
 Greg Smith
 Jake Gans
 Harry Corvese
 Luis Scott-Vargas
 Yuuya Watanabe

GP Chicago (10–11 November 2012)
Format: Modern
Attendance: 1113
 Jacob Wilson
 Josh Utter-Leyton
 Alex Majlaton
 Edgar Flores
 Shane McDermott
 Ryan Hovis
 David Gleicher
 Michael Simon

GP Taipei (24–25 November 2012)
Format: Limited
Attendance: 727
 Makihito Mihara
 Akimasa Yamamoto
 Weng Heng Soh
 Motoki Abe
 Derek Tsang
 Yuuya Watanabe
 Toshiaki Murata
 Lee Shi Tian

GP Toronto (8–9 December 2012)
Format: Modern
Attendance: 1051
 Willy Edel
 Sam Pardee
 Alon Chitiz
 Alex Majlaton
 James Vance
 Collin Morton
 Jon Stern
 Dan Jordan

GP Denver (5–6 January 2013)
Format: Legacy
Attendance: 700
 Vidianto Wijaya
 Pat Cox
 Ryan Pesch
 Joshua Ravitz
 Matt Nass
 Daniel Signorini
 Andrew Ohlschwager
 Donnie Peck

GP Bilbao (19–20 January 2013)
Format: Modern
Attendance: 988
 Mitchell Manders
 Lukas Jaklovsky
 Louis Deltour
 Vasco Bonifacio
 Lorenzo Calzolari
 Martin Scheinin
 Mathieu Deloly
 Francisco Camacho

GP Lyon (3–4 November 2012)
Format: Modern
Attendance: 1326
 Jérémy Dezani
 Emanuel Sutor 
 Mathieu Hautot 
 Davide Colla 
 Peter Dun 
 Olivier Ruel 
 Clement Sarton
 Jonas Köstler

GP Bochum (17–18 November 2012)
Format: Standard
Attendance: 1723
 Martin Juza
 Fabian Dickmann
 Tomas Vanek
 Kamil Napierski
 Enrico Van Eijsden
 Pierre Dagen
 Lukas Tajak
 Sascha Stein

GP San Antonio (24–25 November 2012)
Format: Standard
Attendance: 807
 Tyler Lytle
 Matthew Pratser
 Conley Woods
 Reid Duke
 Harry Corvese
 Ben Rasmussen
 Joel De Santos Jasso
 Matthew Thurber

GP Nagoya (8–9 December 2012)
Format: Standard
Attendance: 1689
 Yuuji Okita
 Rahman Aryabhima
 Mamoru Nagai
 Ryuji Murae
 Kyouhei Kawaguchi
 Kenji Tsumura
 Kazumasa Satou
 Kazuaki Shinohara

GP Atlantic City (12–13 January 2013)
Format: Standard
Attendance: 1648
 Jon Stern
 Josh Utter-Leyton
 Brad Nelson
 Ari Lax
 Matt Costa
 Ryan Leverone
 Lloyd Kurth
 Seneca Hobler

GP Sydney (19–20 January 2013)
Format: Limited
Attendance: 686
 Allen Zhang 
 Justin Cheung
 Tomoharu Saito
 Zen Takahashi
 Daniel Unwin
 Martin Juza
 Stanislav Cifka
 Adam Witton

GP Auckland (3–4 November 2012)
Format: Standard
Attendance: 264
 Walker MacMurdo
 Adam Witton
 Yoshitoki Sakai
 Dylan Brown
 Justin Cheung
 John Denz
 Robert Liu
 Anthony Purdom

GP Charleston (17–18 November 2012)
Format: Standard
Attendance: 661
 Jon Bolding
 Brian Eason
 Matt Keene
 Peter Kelly
 Reid Duke
 Pat Cox
 Gerry Thompson
 Morgan Chang

GP Lisbon (1–2 December 2012)
Format: Limited
Attendance: 1340
 Ivan Floch
 Elias Watsfeldt
 Sveinung Bjørnerud
 Johan Verhulst
 Lasse Nørgaard
 David Calås
 Helder Coelho
 Pedro Carvalho

GP Indianapolis (22–23 December 2012)
Format: Limited
Attendance: 817
 Ben Stark
 Chris Fennell
 Luis Scott-Vargas
 Brian Demars
 Matthias Hunt
 Adam Yurchick
 Tom Martell
 Tyler Lytle

GP Singapore (12–13 January 2013)
Format: Limited
Attendance: 894
 Ken Yukuhiro
 Chapman Sim
 Andrew Cantillana
 Lin Rui Zi
 Jun'ya Nakamura
 Toshiya Kanegawa
 Gao Zhen Xing
 Huang Hao-Shan

GP London (9–10 February 2013)
Format: Limited
Attendance: 1970
 Timothée Simonot
 Bartłomiej Tomiczek
 Manuel Hauck
 David Reitbauer
 Andreas Nordahl
 Per Carlsson
 Fabrizio Anteri
 Jamie Ross

Pro Tour Gatecrash 
Montreal (15–17 February 2013)
Prize pool: $250,000
Format: Standard, Booster Draft
Attendance: 329

Top 8

Final standings

Grand Prix: Quebec City, Charlotte, Yokohama, Verona, Rio de Janeiro, San Diego, Utrecht, Pittsburgh, Strasbourg, Portland, Beijing 

GP Quebec City (23–24 February 2013)
Format: Standard
Attendance: 806
 Nico Christiansen
 Kuo Tzu-Ching
 Felipe Tapia Becerra
 Reid Duke
 Thomas Holzinger
 Wilson Wong
 Maxime Cantin
 Wenzel Krautmann

GP Verona (9–10 March 2013)
Format: Standard
Attendance: 1208
 Mike Krasnitski 
 Andreas Nilsson
 Jérémy Dezani
 Samuele Estratti 
 Toni Ramis Pascual
 Piotr Wald
 Shahar Shenhar
 Max Schultze

GP Utrecht (16–17 March 2013)
Format: Team Limited
Attendance: 2031 (677 teams)
1.
 Fredrik Carlsson 
 Jonathan Bergström 
 Tomas Westling 
2. 
 Joel Larsson
 Elias Watsfeldt 
 Mikael Magnusson 
3.
 René Kraft
 Tobias Radloff
 Martin Zimmermann
4.
 Matteo Versari
 Alessandro Lippi
 Samuele Estratti

GP Charlotte (23–24 February 2013)
Format: Limited
Attendance: 2693
 Frank Skarren
 Gerard Fabiano
 Patrick Sullivan
 Aaron Lewis
 Richard Nguyen
 Ben Isgur
 Ben Stark
 Antonino Baldasari

GP Rio de Janeiro (9–10 March 2013)
Format: Standard
Attendance: 709
 José Francisco Dantas Mangueira da Silva
 Arthur Villela
 Andrés Monsalve 
 Walter Coquemala Filho
 Wellington Cordeiro
 Martín Quiroga
 Jorge Henrique Siqueira
 Matías Arvigo

GP Pittsburgh (23–24 March 2013)
Format: Limited
Attendance: 1628
 Brock Parker
 Alec Nezin
 Gabby Izsak
 Eric Froehlich
 Matthew Falcioni
 Adam Carrasco
 Michael Derczo
 Chase Kovac

GP Beijing (11–12 May 2013)
Format: Limited
Attendance: 894
 Quan Zhou
 Nonthakorn Kositaporn
 Toshiya Kanegawa
 Wei Quan Wong
 Daniel Godfrey
 Shuo Li
 Nandi Zhang
 Bo Li

GP Yokohama (2–3 March 2013)
Format: Limited
Attendance: 2297
 Masaya Kitayama
 Tian Yu Zhao
 Samuel Black
 Makihito Mihara
 Yasutaka Hibino
 Shintarou Ishimura
 Tomomi Shiraishi
 Tomoya Motomura

GP San Diego (16–17 March 2013)
Format: Modern
Attendance: 759
 Nathan Holiday
 Sammy Tuckeman
 Eric Froehlich
 David Sharfman
 Bryan De La Torre
 Brian Kibler
 Ken Yukuhiro
 Matt Ferrando

GP Strasbourg (13–14 April 2013)
Format: Legacy
Attendance: 1364
 Thomas Enevoldsen
 Jacob Wilson
 Alexander Hayne
 Michael Bonde
 Alexey Romanchuk
 Hove Thießen
 Christopher Brunner
 Fabian Görzgen

GP Portland (11–12 May 2013) 
Format: Modern
Attendance: 979
 Sam Pardee
 Joe Demestrio
 Zvi Mowshowitz
 Dan MacDonald
 Mattia Rizzi
 Orie Guo
 Matt Nass
 Paul Rietzl

Pro Tour Dragon's Maze 
San Diego (17–19 May 2013)
Prize pool: $250,000
Format: Block Constructed, Booster Draft
Attendance: 388

Top 8

Final standings

Invitees to the 2013 World Championship 

The following sixteen players received an invitation to the 2013 World Championship due to their performance in the 2012–13 season.

Pro Player of the Year final standings 

After Pro Tour Dragon's Maze Josh Utter-Leyton was awarded the Pro Player of the year title.

References 

Magic: The Gathering professional events